June 17 - Eastern Orthodox Church calendar - June 19

All fixed commemorations below celebrated on July 1 by Orthodox Churches on the Old Calendar.

For June 18th, Orthodox Churches on the Old Calendar commemorate the Saints listed on June 5.

Saints
 Martyrs Leontius, Hypatius and Theodoulos at Tripoli in Phoenicia (70–79) 
 Martyr Aetherus of Nicomedia (305) 
 The Two Martyrs of Cyprus.
 Saint Marina the Virgin, of Bithynia (8th century) 
 Venerable Leontius the Shepherd, monk.
 Venerable Erasmus.

Pre-Schism Western saints
 Saints Mark and Marcellian, twin brothers and deacons who suffered in Rome under Maximian (c. 287) 
 Saints Cyriacus and Paula of Málaga, two Christians, stoned to death in Málaga in Spain in the Diocletianic Persecution (305) 
 Martyr Elpidios, in Gaul (4th century)
 Saint Amandus of Bordeaux, successor of St Delphinus as Bishop of Bordeaux in France, Confessor (c. 431)
 Saint Alena of Brussels, martyr (c. 640) 
 Saint Calogerus the Anchorite, a Greek who lived for thirty-five years as a hermit near Girgenti in Sicily after preaching Christ in the isles of Lipari (c. 486) 
 Saints Gregory, Demetrius and Calogerus, respectively a bishop, archdeacon and abbot in North Africa, driven out by Arian Vandals (5th century) 
 Saint Fortunatus the Philosopher, a bishop driven from the north of Italy by the Lombards (c. 569) 
 Saint Osmanna (Osanna), a nun at the convent of Jouarre in France (c. 700)
 Saint Guy of Baume, successor of St Berno at Baume Abbey in France, later a hermit near Fay-en-Bresse (c. 940)

Post-Schism Orthodox saints
 Venerable Peter of Koriša, aristocrat who gave away his possessions to become a monk at the Monastery of the Holy Archangels, later a hermit in the Šar Mountains (1275)  (see also: June 5 )
 Venerable Leontius, canonarch of the Kiev Caves (14th century)
 Venerable Leontius the Myrrh-gusher (Leontius the Hagiorite), of Argos and of Dionysiou monastery on Mount Athos, clairvoyant (1605)

New martyrs and confessors
 New Hieromartyr Nicanor (Morozkin), Archimandrite, of Spas-Ruzsky, Moscow (1938)
 New Hieromartyrs Basil Smirnov, Alexander Krutitsky, Basil Krylov and Sergius Krotkov, Priests (1938)
 New Hieromartyr Ioannicius (Lipovac), Metropolitan of Montenegro and the Littoral, executed by Communist partisans at the close of World War II (1945)  (see also: June 4 )

Other commemorations
 Synaxis of the Church of the Commander-in-Chief Michael the Archangel, near the Church of St. Julian in the Forum, Constantinople.
 Bogolubov Icon of the Most Holy Theotokos (1155)
 Meeting of the Piukhtitsa ("At the Source") Icon of the Most Holy Theotokos (1894, 1946)
 Uncovering of the relics (1997) of New Hiero-confessor Victor (Ostrovidov), Bishop of Glazov (1934)

Icon gallery

Notes

References

Sources
 June 18/July 1. Orthodox Calendar (PRAVOSLAVIE.RU).
 July 1 / June 18. HOLY TRINITY RUSSIAN ORTHODOX CHURCH (A parish of the Patriarchate of Moscow).
 June 18. OCA - The Lives of the Saints.
 The Autonomous Orthodox Metropolia of Western Europe and the Americas (ROCOR). St. Hilarion Calendar of Saints for the year of our Lord 2004. St. Hilarion Press (Austin, TX). p. 45.
 The Eighteenth Day of the Month of June. Orthodoxy in China.
 June 18. Latin Saints of the Orthodox Patriarchate of Rome.
 The Roman Martyrology. Transl. by the Archbishop of Baltimore. Last Edition, According to the Copy Printed at Rome in 1914. Revised Edition, with the Imprimatur of His Eminence Cardinal Gibbons. Baltimore: John Murphy Company, 1916. pp. 177–178.
 Rev. Richard Stanton. A Menology of England and Wales, or, Brief Memorials of the Ancient British and English Saints Arranged According to the Calendar, Together with the Martyrs of the 16th and 17th Centuries. London: Burns & Oates, 1892. pp. 274–275.
Greek Sources
 Great Synaxaristes:  18 ΙΟΥΝΙΟΥ. ΜΕΓΑΣ ΣΥΝΑΞΑΡΙΣΤΗΣ.
  Συναξαριστής. 18 Ιουνίου. ECCLESIA.GR. (H ΕΚΚΛΗΣΙΑ ΤΗΣ ΕΛΛΑΔΟΣ). 
  18 Ιουνίου. Αποστολική Διακονία της Εκκλησίας της Ελλάδος (Apostoliki Diakonia of the Church of Greece).
  18/06/2018. Ορθόδοξος Συναξαριστής. 
Russian Sources
  1 июля (18 июня). Православная Энциклопедия под редакцией Патриарха Московского и всея Руси Кирилла (электронная версия). (Orthodox Encyclopedia - Pravenc.ru).
  18 июня по старому стилю / 1 июля по новому стилю. Русская Православная Церковь - Православный церковный календарь на 2017 год.
  18 июня (ст.ст.) 1 июля 2014 (нов. ст.). Русская Православная Церковь Отдел внешних церковных связей. (DECR).

June in the Eastern Orthodox calendar